The R249 road is a regional road in Ireland, located in County Donegal.

References

Regional roads in the Republic of Ireland
Roads in County Donegal